The 2014–15 Colgate Raiders men's basketball team represented Colgate University during the 2014–15 NCAA Division I men's basketball season. The Raiders, led by fourth year head coach Matt Langel, played their home games at Cotterell Court and were members of the Patriot League. They finished the season 16–17, 12–6 in Patriot League play to finish in second place. They defeated Navy to advance to the semifinals of the Patriot League tournament where they lost to American.

Roster

Schedule

|-
!colspan=9 style="background:#800000; color:#FFFFFF;"| Non-conference regular season

|-
!colspan=9 style="background:#800000; color:#FFFFFF;"| Conference regular season

|-
!colspan=9 style="background:#800000; color:#FFFFFF;"| Patriot League tournament

References

Colgate Raiders men's basketball seasons
Colgate
Colgate
Colgate